Ivo Daneu (born 6 October 1937) is a retired Slovenian professional basketball player and coach. During his playing career, at a height of 1.91 m (6'3") tall, he played at the point guard and shooting guard positions. He represented the Yugoslavia national basketball team internationally. 

He was voted the Best Sportsperson of the Year in Yugoslavia, in 1967, and the Slovenian Sportsperson of the Year, in 1969. He was named one of FIBA's 50 Greatest Players in 1991. He was enshrined into the FIBA Hall of Fame, in 2007. He was inducted into the Slovenian Athletes Hall of Fame, in 2012.

Playing career

Club career
During his club career, Daneu played with Branik Maribor (1949–1956) at the junior levels, and with AŠK Olimpija (1956–1970), at the senior men's level. With AŠK Olimpija, he won the Yugoslav First Federal League championship six times (1957, 1959, 1961, 1962, 1966, and 1970). He was a FIBA European Selection in 1967. After his playing career, his number 13 jersey was retired by Olimpija.

National team career
Daneu played in 209 games with the senior Yugoslavian national team, from 1956 to 1970. With Yugoslavia's senior team, he won the following medals: the gold medal at the 1970 FIBA World Championship, the silver medal at the 1968 Summer Olympic Games, silver medals at the 1963 FIBA World Championship and the 1967 FIBA World Championship (where he was also voted the tournament's MVP), silver medals at the 1961 EuroBasket, 1965 EuroBasket, and 1969 EuroBasket, and a bronze medal at the 1963 EuroBasket.

Coaching career
Daneu was the head coach of AŠK Olimpija (1970–71), and Rudar Trbovlje (1976).

References

External links

 FIBA Profile
 FIBA Europe Profile
 FIBA Hall of Fame Profile
 Olimpija Profile

1937 births
Living people
Basketball players at the 1960 Summer Olympics
Basketball players at the 1964 Summer Olympics
Basketball players at the 1968 Summer Olympics
Competitors at the 1959 Mediterranean Games
FIBA Hall of Fame inductees
FIBA World Championship-winning players
KK Olimpija players
Medalists at the 1968 Summer Olympics
Mediterranean Games gold medalists for Yugoslavia
Mediterranean Games medalists in basketball
Olympic basketball players of Yugoslavia
Olympic medalists in basketball
Olympic silver medalists for Yugoslavia
Point guards
Shooting guards
Slovenian basketball coaches
Slovenian men's basketball players
Sportspeople from Maribor
Yugoslav basketball coaches
Yugoslav men's basketball players
1963 FIBA World Championship players
1967 FIBA World Championship players
1970 FIBA World Championship players